Moacyr Jaime Scliar (March 23, 1937February 27, 2011) was a Brazilian writer and physician. Most of his writing centers on issues of Jewish identity in the Diaspora and particularly on being Jewish in Brazil.

Scliar is best known outside Brazil for his 1981 novel Max and the Cats (Max e os Felinos), the story of a young German man who flees Berlin after he comes to the attention of the Nazis for having had an affair with a married woman. En route to Brazil, his ship sinks, and he finds himself alone in a dinghy with a jaguar who had been travelling in the hold.

Background
Scliar was born in Porto Alegre, Rio Grande do Sul, into a Jewish family that immigrated to Brazil from Bessarabia in 1919. He graduated in medicine in 1962, majoring in public health. He first worked at the Jewish Hospital for the Elderly in Porto Alegre, and later worked in the public health field in tuberculosis prevention and treatment.

Writing
A prolific writer, Scliar published over 100 books in Portuguese, covering various literary genres: short stories; novels; young adult fiction; children's books; and essays.

In 1962, his first book Stories of a Doctor in Training was published, although later on  he regretted having published it so young. His second book The Carnival of the Animals was published in 1968.

In a recent autobiographical piece, Scliar discusses his membership of the Jewish, medical, Gaucho, and Brazilian tribes. His novel The Centaur in the Garden was included among the 100 Greatest Works of Modern Jewish Literature by The National Yiddish Book Center. In an interview with Judith Bolton-Fasman published in The Jewish Reader, August 2003, Scliar commented on his use of the centaur as a metaphor: "The centaur is a symbol of the double identity, characteristic of Jews in a country like Brazil. At home, you speak Yiddish, eat gefilte fish, and celebrate Shabbat. But in the streets, you have soccer, samba, and Portuguese. After a while you feel like a centaur."

Translations
Scliar's fiction has been translated into English, Dutch, French, Swedish, German, Spanish, Italian, Hebrew, Czech, Serbian, Georgian, Slovene and Danish. His translated fiction is listed in the UNESCO international bibliography of translations.

Awards and recognitions
2003 — Elected a lifetime member of the Brazilian Academy of Letters.
2009 São Paulo Prize for Literature — Shortlisted in the Best Book of the Year category for Manual da Paixão Solitária
2010 São Paulo Prize for Literature — Chosen to serve as a member of the Final Jury

Works in English

Books 
The Centaur in the Garden, Translator: Margaret A. Neves
The Gods of Raquel, Translator: Eloah F. Giacomelli
The One-Man Army, Translator: Eloah F. Giacomelli
The Carnival of the Animals, Translator: Eloah F. Giacomelli
The Ballad of the False Messiah, Translator: Eloah F. Giacomelli
The Strange Nation of Rafael Mendes, Translator: Eloah F. Giacomelli
The Volunteers, Translator: Eloah F. Giacomelli
The Enigmatic Eye, Translator: Eloah F. Giacomelli
Max and the Cats , Translator: Eloah F. GiacomelliThe Collected Stories of Moacyr Scliar, Translator: Eloah F. GiacomelliThe War in Bom Fim, Translator: David William FosterKafka's Leopards, Translator Thomas O. Beebee

 Short Stories in Anthologies Inside My Dirty Head - The Holocaust, translator Eloah F. Giacomelli, in TROPICAL SYNAGOGUES: SHORT STORIES BY JEWISH LATIN AMERICAN WRITERS, editor Ilan StavansThe Plagues, translator Eloah F. Giacomelli, in A HAMMOCK BENEATH THE MANGOES - STORIES FROM LATIN AMERICA, editor Thomas Colchie
 Van Gogh's Ear,  translator Eloah F. Giacomelli, in THE VINTAGE BOOK OF LATIN AMERICAN STORIES, editors Carlos Fuentes and Julio Ortega
 The Prophets of Benjamin Bok, translator Eloah F. Giacomelli, in WITH SIGNS AND WONDER: AN INTERNATIONAL ANTHOLOGY OF JEWISH FABULIST FICTION, editor Daniel M. Jaffe
 The Ballad of the False Messiah, translator Eloah F. Giacomelli, in  THE OXFORD BOOK OF JEWISH STORIES, editor Ilan StavansThe Cow ; The Last Poor Man, translator Eloah F. Giacomelli,  in  THE OXFORD ANTHOLOGY OF THE BRAZILIAN SHORT STORY, editor K. David Jackson

 Works in Portuguese 
Books
 Short stories 
 O carnaval dos animais. Porto Alegre, Movimento, 1968
 A balada do falso Messias. São Paulo, Ática, 1976
 Histórias da terra trêmula. São Paulo, Escrita, 1976
 O anão no televisor. Porto Alegre, Globo, 1979
 Os melhores contos de Moacyr Scliar. São Paulo, Global, 1984
 Dez contos escolhidos. Brasília, Horizonte, 1984
 O olho enigmático. Rio, Guanabara, 1986
 Contos reunidos. São Paulo, Companhia das Letras, 1995
 O amante da Madonna. Porto Alegre, Mercado Aberto, 1997
 Os contistas. Rio, Ediouro, 1997
 Histórias para (quase) todos os gostos. Porto Alegre, L&PM, 1998
 Pai e filho, filho e pai. Porto Alegre, L&PM, 2002
 . Rio de Janeiro, Agir, 2009.

 Novels 
 A guerra no Bom Fim. Rio, Expressão e Cultura, 1972. Porto Alegre, L&PM, 
 O Exército de um Homem Só. Rio, Expressão e Cultura, 1973. Porto Alegre, L&PM, 
 Os deuses de Raquel. Rio, Expressão e Cultura, 1975. Porto Alegre, L&PM, 
 O ciclo das águas. Porto Alegre, Globo, 1975; Porto Alegre, L&PM, 1996, 
 Mês de cães danados. Porto Alegre, L&PM, 1977, 
 Doutor Miragem. Porto Alegre, L&PM, 1979, 
 Os voluntários. Porto Alegre, L&PM, 1979, 
 O Centauro no Jardim. Rio, Nova Fronteira, 1980. Porto Alegre, L&PM (Tradução francesa:"Le centaure dans le jardin" ),Presses de la Renaissance, Paris, 1985
 Max e os felinos. Porto Alegre, L&PM, 1981, 
 A estranha nação de Rafael Mendes. Porto Alegre, L&PM, 1983, 
 Cenas da vida minúscula. Porto Alegre, L&PM, 1991, 
 Sonhos tropicais. São Paulo, Companhia das Letras, 1992, 
 A majestade do Xingu. São Paulo, Companhia das Letras, 1997, 
 A mulher que escreveu a Bíblia. São Paulo, Companhia das Letras, 1999, 
 Os leopardos de Kafka. São Paulo, Companhia das Letras, 2000, 
 Uma história farroupilha. Porto Alegre, L&PM, 2004, 
 Na noite do ventre, o diamante. Rio de Janeiro: Ed. Objetiva, 2005, 
 Ciumento de carteirinha Editora Ática, 2006, 
 Os vendilhões do templo Companhia das Letras, 2006, 
 Manual da paixão solitária. São Paulo: Companhia das Letras, 2008
 Eu vos abraço, milhões. São Paulo: Companhia das Letras, . 2010

 Children and Youth Fiction 
 Cavalos e obeliscos. Porto Alegre, Mercado Aberto, 1981; São Paulo, Ática, 2001, 
 A festa no castelo. Porto Alegre, L&PM, 1982, 
 Memórias de um aprendiz de escritor. São Paulo, Cia. Editora Nacional, 1984*, 
 No caminho dos sonhos. São Paulo, FTD, 1988, 
 O tio que flutuava. São Paulo, Ática, 1988, 
 Os cavalos da República. São Paulo, FTD, 1989, 
 Pra você eu conto. São Paulo, Atual, 1991, 
 Uma história só pra mim. São Paulo, Atual, 1994, 
 Um sonho no caroço do abacate. São Paulo, Global, 1995, 
 O Rio Grande farroupilha. São Paulo, Ática, 1995, 
 Câmera na mão, o guarani no coração. São Paulo, Ática, 1998, 
 A colina dos suspiros. São Paulo, Moderna, 1999, 
 O livro da medicina. São Paulo, Companhia das Letrinhas, 2000, 
 O mistério da casa verde. São Paulo, Ática, 2000, 
 O ataque do comando P.Q. São Paulo, Ática, 2001, 
 O sertão vai virar mar. São Paulo, Ática, 2002, 
 Aquele estranho colega, o meu pai. São Paulo, Atual, 2002, 
 Éden-Brasil. São Paulo, Companhia das Letras, 2002, 
 O irmão que veio de longe. Idem, idem, 
 Nem uma coisa, nem outra. Rio, Rocco, 2003, 
 Aprendendo a amar - e a curar. São Paulo, Scipione, 2003, 
 Navio das cores. São Paulo, Berlendis & Vertecchia, 2003, 
 Livro de Todos - O Mistério do Texto Roubado. São Paulo, Imprensa Oficial do Estado de São Paulo, 2008. Obra coletiva (Moacyr Scliar e vários autores), 

 Chronicles 
 A massagista japonesa. Porto Alegre, L&PM, 1984
 Um país chamado infância. Porto Alegre, Sulina, 1989
 Dicionário do viajante insólito. Porto Alegre, L&PM, 1995
 Minha mãe não dorme enquanto eu não chegar. Porto Alegre, L&PM, 1996. Artes e Ofícios, 2001
 O imaginário cotidiano. São Paulo, Global, 2001
 A língua de três pontas: crônicas e citações sobre a arte de falar mal. Porto Alegre

 Essays 
 A condição judaica. Porto Alegre, L&PM, 1987
 Do mágico ao social: a trajetória da saúde pública. Porto Alegre, L&PM, 1987; SP, Senac, 2002
 Cenas médicas. Porto Alegre, Editora da Ufrgs, 1988. Artes&Ofícios, 2002
 Enígmas da culpa. São Paulo, Objetiva, 2007

References

Bibliography
 Florina Florescu, "Of Genes, Mutations, and Desires in Franz Kafka’s The Metamorphosis and Moacyr Scliar’s The Centaur in the Garden Catalina," in Elizabeth Klaver (ed), The Body in Medical Culture'' (Albany (NY), SUNY Press, 2010),

1937 births
2011 deaths
Brazilian writers
Brazilian science fiction writers
Jewish writers
Brazilian Ashkenazi Jews
Brazilian public health doctors
Members of the Brazilian Academy of Letters
People from Porto Alegre
Brazilian medical writers
Federal University of Rio Grande do Sul alumni